The 1944 Irish Greyhound Derby took place during July and August with the final being held at Shelbourne Park in Dublin on 12 August.

The winner Clonbonny Bridge won £500 and was owned and trained by A O'Neill.

Final result 
At Shelbourne Park, 12 August (over 525 yards):

Distances 
head, 1½  (lengths)

Competition Report
The 1944 Irish Derby was considered the best entry to date with a greyhound called Mad Tanist owned by Jack McAllister being given the tag of ante-post favourite. Famous Knight the 1943 winner would not defend his title after leaving for England previously. Mad Tanist son of Tanist, won his first round defeating Clonbonny Bridge by a remarkable ten lengths in 30.20. Irish Puppy Derby winner Fawn Cherry was second fastest in 30.25, the fawn dog had just returned from London after eight months there.

In the second round Mad Tanist once again impressed in 29.86 followed by an improving Clonbonny Bridge and Fawn Cherry. Other heat winners were Laurel Fidget (30.15), Down Signal (30.34) and Lively Breeze (30.34). In the second semi-final Mad Tanist at odds of 4-9 and Fawn Cherry both went out after awful trouble at the first bend in a race won by 25-1 shot Mallacks in 30.38. The first semi had gone to Laurel Fidget who defeated Clonbonny Bridge and Lively Breeze in 30.20.

In a controversial final Laurel Fidget led from Down Signal until the third bend which left Down Signal clear but after he swung wide on the run-in Clonbonny Bridge made ground and the pair crossed the finish line together. Clonbonny Bridge was given the verdict by the stewards but it was a result which many disputed.

See also
 1944 UK & Ireland Greyhound Racing Year

References

Greyhound Derby
Irish Greyhound Derby